The 1921 Campeonato Paulista, organized by the APEA (Associação Paulista de Esportes Atléticos), was the 20th season of São Paulo's top association football league. In that year, the championship expanded, with the addition of Sírio and the return of Germânia. In addition to that, Mackenzie, under financial trouble and increasingly worse results on the latest championships, entered a merger with the recently founded Portuguesa.  Paulistano won the title for the 8th time. the top scorer was Paulistano's Arthur Friedenreich with 33 goals.

System
The championship was disputed in a double-round robin system, with the team with the most points winning the title.

Championship

References

Campeonato Paulista seasons
Paulista